The Rest of New Order (stylised as (the rest of) NewOrder) is a remix album by English band New Order, released on 21 August 1995 by London Records.

Overview
New Order had been on hiatus as of late 1993 following the turbulent recording and touring of the successful Republic album. The individual members had returned to the side projects that had occupied them during the group's previous hiatus that lasted 1989 to 1992. Republic had been the first album that the group had released for London Records, and with the group announcing little intention of working together the label went ahead compiling The Best of New Order. This venture had proven popular, and sold very well in the competitive Christmas market. It neatly collected most of the band's hits into one package. The hits album was promoted by two singles, remixes of "True Faith" and "1963"; these too proved to be popular. Clearly there was still a market for New Order.

The Rest of New Order followed nine months later, this time the compilers brought together a selection of older remixes alongside new specially-commissioned remixes. The remixes of "Blue Monday", "Confusion", "Touched by the Hand of God", "Bizarre Love Triangle", "Age of Consent", "Temptation" and "Everything's Gone Green" were all new radical reinterpretations. The four singles from Republic are represented with remixes that had previously appeared as B-sides. The oldest mix included was Shep Pettibone's take on "True Faith" from 1987.

Release
The compilation was released on compact disc, cassette and double LP. Each version has a different track listing. Cassette editions include an additional mix of "Temptation", while limited editions of the CD and cassette came with an additional bonus disc/cassette of "Blue Monday" remixes. This version replaces the white background on the cover with a reflective brown/gold. The album reached number five on the UK Albums Chart and number 41 on the Swedish Albums Chart. To promote the album, "Blue Monday" was once again re-released. The single was backed with remixes that appear on the bonus disc of the limited edition CD. The version of "Blue Monday" released was the Hardfloor Mix, dubbed "Blue Monday-95", and reached number 17 in the United Kingdom, number 29 in Ireland, number 38 in Sweden and number 54 in Germany.

At the time of the release, the compact disc version was amongst the longest compact discs released, clocking in at 80:02 with the pregap included. Without the pregap, the compact disc would clock in at 80:00. Therefore, the original CD release is 2 seconds longer than the recognized official compact disc duration limit.

The unusual figure on the cover is a pink version of the blue stylized question mark featured on the cover of The Best of New Order. Sometimes in chart books, this album is listed as ? (The Rest of) New Order.

Track listing

1 Same version as CD1 and Cassette 1 track 2.

Personnel
 New Order – production
 Stephen Hague – production (CD tracks 1, 3, 7, 8 and 10)
 Arthur Baker – production (CD track 4)
 John Robie – production (CD track 4)
 Martin Hannett – production (LP track 4)
 Peter Saville – art direction
 Howard Wakefield – design
 Martin Orpen and Idea – digital imaging
 Trevor Key – photography

Charts

References

1995 remix albums
London Records remix albums
New Order (band) remix albums